Buiari Island is an island in the Louisiade Archipelago in Milne Bay Province, Papua New Guinea.

Administration 
The island is part of Buiari Ward (which also includes some tiny villages on near Basilaki island. The ward belong to Bwanabwana Rural Local Level Government Area LLG, Samarai-Murua District, which are in Milne Bay Province.

Geography 
Buiari is located Southwest of Basilaki, and is part of the Basilaki group, itself a part of Samarai Islands of the Louisiade Archipelago.

Demographics 
The population of 500 is living in 2 villages across the island. The most important one, and where the dock is located, is Buiari, and is on the north coast facing Basilaki. The smaller one, Numodubo, is in the central plateau

Economy 
The islanders, are farmers as opposed to eastern Louisiade Archipelago islanders. they grow Sago, Taro, and Yams for crops.

Transportation 
There is a dock at Buiari.

References

Islands of Milne Bay Province
Louisiade Archipelago